The Farmer is a two-act comic opera with music by William Shield and a libretto by the Irish writer John O'Keeffe, set in London and Kent and premiered at the Theatre Royal Covent Garden on 31 October 1787.

O'Keeffe adapted the text from his play The Plague of Riches, which had been rejected. Its songs included "A Flaxen-Headed Cow-Boy".

Sources
http://www.oxforddnb.com/view/article/20658

References

External links
 

1787 operas
English comic operas
Operas set in the British Isles
Plays by John O'Keeffe
English-language operas